The Australian Squadron was the name given to the British naval force assigned to the Australia Station from 1859 to 1911.

The Squadron was initially a small force of Royal Navy warships based in Sydney, and although intended to protect the colonies of Australia and New Zealand, the ships were primarily used for surveying and police work. The isolation of Australia from the rest of the British Empire meant the force was easily neglected, and by the 1870s, was perceived to be useless for its intended role. Following the passing of the Australasian Defence Act 1887, an additional 'Auxiliary Squadron' was assigned to the Station by the British Admiralty with the responsibility for protecting trade in the region. During the early 1900s, the Australian and New Zealand governments agreed to help fund the Squadron, while the Admiralty committed itself to keeping the Squadron at a constant strength.

As a British force, the Australia Squadron ceased on 4 October 1913, when the ships of the Royal Australian Navy (RAN) entered Sydney Harbour for the first time. However, the term was subsequently used between 1926 and 1949 to refer to the ships of the RAN: after the decommissioning and scuttling of the battlecruiser  and other cutbacks, the term 'Australian Fleet' was thought to be inappropriate to describe the navy's strength.  served as squadron flagship between 1922 and 1928.

See also

List of ships assigned to the Australian Squadron
Australia Station

Notes

References

Royal Navy squadrons
Military history of Australia